Denag (fl. 459), was a Sasanian queen (banbishn). She was the wife of the king (shah) Yazdegerd II, and functioned as queen regent in Ctesiphon during the civil war between her sons in 457-459.

Life
Her origins are unknown, though given that her name had previously been used by Sasanian princesses, Denag may have been born a member of the royal family.

When Yazdegerd I died in 457, Hormizd III ascended the throne at Ray. His younger brother Peroz I, with the support of the powerful Mihranid magnate Raham Mihran, fled to the northeastern part of the empire and began raising an army in order to claim the throne for himself. The empire thus fell into a dynastic struggle and became divided; the mother of the two brothers, Denag temporarily ruled as regent of the empire from its capital, Ctesiphon.

Peroz eventually emerged victorious during the struggle, and became the new king of the Sasanian Empire. Hormizd was killed alongside three members of his family.

References

Sources
 
 
 

 
 

Sasanian queens
5th-century Iranian people
 5th-century women rulers